Thombre (also spelled as Thombare), is a surname native to Indian state of Maharashtra.

Notable people
Trimbak Bapuji Thombre ("Balkavi Thombre"), (1890-1918) - a Marathi poet.
Prarthana Thombare, an Indian tennis player.

References

Indian surnames